Mount Murchison may refer to:

In Antarctica
 Mount Murchison (George V Coast), Antarctica
 Mount Murchison (Victoria Land), the highest peak in the Mountaineer Range, Antarctica

In Australia
 Mount Murchison (Tasmania)
 Mount Murchison, a cattle station near Wilcannia

In Canada
 Mount Murchison (Alberta)

In New Zealand
 Mount Murchison (Canterbury), in the Southern Alps, Canterbury region
 Mount Murchison (Tasman), the highest peak in the Braeburn Range, Tasman Region, New Zealand

See also
 Murchison Mountains, a mountain range in Fiordland, New Zealand
 Murchison (disambiguation)